Shuzenji Onsen is a geothermal spring system in the Tagata District of Shizuoka Prefecture, Japan, in the central region of Izu Peninsula.

History
The hot springs have been used for over fourteen centuries  for their therapeutic properties. Folklore tales describe the discovery and founding of the hot springs by Kobo Daishi (774-835), a Buddhist monk who probed at the rocks in the river with his walking stick (tokko) releasing the hot spring water. The historical town that was built up around the geothermal system was also called Shuzenji, however it has since merged into the city of Izu.

Description
Tokko-no-yu is the best known hot spring in the system; it is located between the banks of the Katsura River in the middle of Shuzen town. A small rustic open-air public bath house has been built above the spring containing an ashiyu or foot spa. Kawara-no-yu is a hot spring in the system that is used as a public foot bath; it is located at the riverside. There are numerous commercial spa hotels and historic ryokan in the area, as well as Hakoyu, the public bathhouse.

Geology
The onsen system is part of the Amagi volcanic mountain range. In Japan, more than 27,000 hot spring sources exist, many of which, including Shuzenji Onsen have been developed into onsen towns.

See also
 List of hot springs in Japan
 List of hot springs in the world

References

Hot springs of Shizuoka Prefecture
Spa towns in Japan
Geothermal areas
Balneotherapy